4º Xou da Xuxa is the fifth studio album by Brazilian singer and TV host Xuxa Meneghel, released on 11 July 1989. This LP was the fourth album of the collection Xou da Xuxa of a total of seven.

The album sold 2.920.000 copies officially, being 2 million copies sold in advance, becoming the biggest selling album of Brazil in 1989, and the second best-selling album of her music career, is also the fifth best-selling album in the history of Brazilian music.

Xuxa 5 
With the success of "Ilariê", released on the previous album, was ordered another hectic song Xou da Xuxa 3 (1988). This time, Cid Guerreiro brought "Tindolelê".

Another well-known track of the album is "Bobeou Dançou". The song was initially recorded by Michael Sullivan for the Xou da Xuxa scene, and was later recorded by Xuxa when it became a Sunday show.

The song "Alerta" was composed based on the letter a boy wrote to his father before he died, a victim of overdose, due to the use of drugs.

"A música não pode parar", originally recorded for this album, was re-recorded a few years later by paquito Alexandre.

It is not known where the pool trial was conducted. Some say the photos were taken at Marlene Mattos's site, others say it was at Xuxa's house.

Release and reception 
4º Xou da Xuxa hit the stores on July 11, 1989, by Som Livre, in CD, cassette and LP formats. The album was re-released in 1996 and in 2006. In 2013, Som Livre in partnership with Xuxa Produções, launched the Xou da Xuxa + CD inédito Seleção Fãs, a box with all 7 discs released at the time of the TV show, and with It a CD with unpublished songs, chosen by the fans of the TV host. The album receiving diamond certification by Associação Brasileira de Produtores de Discos (ABPD), sold 2,900,000 copies, surpassing all records released in Brazil that year, becoming Xuxa, the country's largest record seller.

Xou of the Xuxa 89 Tour, was the third tour performed by Xuxa, based on the album 4º Xou da Xuxa, the tour was presented in several cities in Brazil as Salvador, Natal, Brasilia, Rio de Janeiro, São Paulo, Angra dos Reis and Feira de Santana. The shows that were performed outside Brazil were in Mexico City, Guadalajara, Buenos Aires, Santiago and Cordoba. The tour began on August 5, 1989 and ended on December 10 of that year.

Promotion
Most of the songs were performed and performed on program Xou da Xuxa. A special edition of the child was made where the presenter released some songs from the album.

"Remelexuxa" won a clip at Fantástico (Fantastic) in 1989, "Milagre da Vida" won a music videos at the Christmas special of the same year and "Tindolelê" won a video at the 1990 Christmas special.

Xuxa also released the album in the programs Globo de Ouro and Domingão do Faustão. In addition to the Xou da Xuxa 89 tour, started on August 5, 1989 and closed on December 10 of the same year.

Also a TV commercial in three versions was published, advertisements in newspapers and magazines and billboards by some Brasília capitals of Brazil like São Paulo.

Track listing

Personnel
Produced: Michael Sullivan and Paulo Massadas
Artistic Coordination: Max Pierre
Photos: André Wanderley
Studio Assistants and Mixing: Cezar Barbosa, Ivan Carvalho, Sergio Rocha, Marquinhos, Julio Martins, Alexandre Ribas
Recording and mixing engineer: Jorge 'Gordo' Guimarães
Graphic Coordination: Marciso Pena Carvalho
Recorded in the studios: Acronym
Editing and Editing: Jorge 'Gordo' Guimarães
Creation and Illustrations: Reinaldo Waisman
Additional engineers (Free Sound): Edu, Luiz Paulo, D'Orey, Mario Jorge, Beto Vaz, Célio Martins

Sales

See also 
 List of best-selling albums in Brazil
List of best-selling Latin albums

References

External links 
 4º Xou da Xuxa at Discogs

1989 albums
Xuxa albums
Children's music albums by Brazilian artists
Som Livre albums
Portuguese-language albums